Culloden Point is a small peninsula north of Montauk, New York, that marks the east entrance to Fort Pond Bay from Gardiners Bay.

HMS Culloden
During the American Revolutionary War, the British ship of the line  ran aground here early on January 24, 1781, while attempting to get from Block Island Sound  out to the open Atlantic Ocean to escape a winter gale and snowstorm with two other British warships. As recounted in Long Island and the Sea by Bill Bleyer (The History Press, 2019), the ship of the line , leading the trio, successfully turned around at midnight when her captain realized they had not cleared Montauk Point. But Captain George Balfour of Culloden continued on until 4 AM, when lookouts saw breakers ahead and tried unsuccessfully to turn the ship back into Block Island Sound. Efforts to refloat Culloden the next day were unsuccessful, so after recovering bronze cannons and other supplies and leaving old iron cannon behind, Balfour ordered the ship burned to the waterline to keep her out of Patriot hands.

The wreck was discovered in the 1970s when portions of it washed ashore (reports indicate that some of the washed-up debris had been used for beach campfires).  One of the cannons is on display at the East Hampton Marine Museum in Amagansett, New York, which has an extensive display of Culloden artifacts.

The wreck is protected on the National Register of Historic Places and now is the first underwater park on Long Island, New York. The park is accessible on a single-lane gravel road at the west end of Soundview Drive. Divers use a large rock with pebbles on top of it to the north of the bluff stairs as the landmark for reaching the wreck. They follow a heading of 333 degrees. The debris field is marked by buoys. Usually little of the wreck is visible, typically just rust stains in the sand, but some portions of the hull sometimes can be seen after storms.

Prior to the discovery of the wreck in the 1970s, the spit was called Will's Point, possibly named after Will Indian, a herder mentioned in early East Hampton Town records.

Amistad
In 1839  anchored at Culloden Point after the surviving crew tried to convince their revolting slave captors that they had returned to Africa. They went for provisions in the village of Montauk.

Leisurama
In the early 1960s, about 200 Leisurama prefabricated homes designed by Andrew Geller were built at the point after being sold from a display on the ninth floor of Macy's in New York City.

External links

 East Hampton Star article on site
 Suffolk Life article on Leisurama homes
 NJscuba on dive site

East Hampton (town), New York
Landforms of Suffolk County, New York
Peninsulas of New York (state)